Frederiksborg may refer to:

 Frederiksborg Castle, in Hillerød, Denmark
 Frederiksborg, former name of Hillerød, a municipality to the north of Copenhagen, Denmark
 Frederiksborg County, former county on the island of Zealand in Denmark
 Fort Frederiksborg, Danish and later English fort built in 1661 in contemporary Ghana
 Frederiksborger, a kind of horse originating in Denmark
 Frederiksborg Glacier, on the east coast of the Greenland ice sheet

See also
 Treaty of Frederiksborg, signed at Frederiksborg Castle in 1720